The Bendix Company manufactured the Bendix automobile in Logansport, Indiana from 1908 until 1909.

See also
Bendix Corporation

References

Defunct motor vehicle manufacturers of the United States
Motor vehicle manufacturers based in Indiana
Defunct companies based in Indiana
Bendix Corporation